Chisternon is a genus of baenid turtles from the Eocene of North America.

References 
The Osteology of the Reptiles by Alfred Sherwood Romer

External links
Chisternon in the Paleobiology Database

Baenidae
Prehistoric turtle genera
Eocene turtles
Eocene reptiles of North America
Fossil taxa described in 1872
Taxa named by Joseph Leidy